Class 31 was a fireless shunting steam locomotive, used at an oil refinery in Cerrik and operated between Cerrik and Papër. Not sure if the locomotive was operated by the factory or by Hekurudha Shqiptare, the railway company of Albania.

The locomotive was second-hand and originally built for pharmaceutical factory Wolff Walsrode for a factory in Bomlitz. It was sold to Albania in 1956. In the seventies it was sold to a factory in Ballsh. The locomotive was scrapped in October 2010

References

Steam locomotives of Albania
Standard gauge locomotives of Albania
Railway locomotives introduced in 1956